This is a list of notable people related to the University of Wolverhampton and its predecessor institutions, such as Wolverhampton and Staffordshire Technical College, Wolverhampton and Staffordshire College of Technology, Wolverhampton College of Art, and The Polytechnic, Wolverhampton.

Notable alumni

 Nando Bodha, Minister of Tourism & Leisure and Minister of Agriculture, Mauritius
 Trevor Beattie (advertising executive)
 Peter Bebb, special effect artist
 Sir Terence Beckett (former director-general, CBI
 Vernie Bennett (singer, formerly of Eternal)
 Major J. Alan Biggins TD MA MSc PhD FSA - Scientist and Surveyor; applied Biology 1972
 Scott Boswell (former professional cricketer)
 David Carruthers (former online gambling executive)
 Dennis A Bayley C.Chem. FIMMM.  Research Chemist , Polymer Chemistry consultant , life member Association of the Profession of Chemistry in Ontario.
 Mimi-Isabella Cesar, rhythmic gymnast 
 Major Peter Cottrell (soldier, author and military historian)
 Claire Darke, 161st Mayor of Wolverhampton
 Paul Darke, academic, artist and disability rights activist 
 Tim Dutton, Actor. 
 Bill Etheridge (UKIP MEP)
 Michael John Foster (former Labour MP, Parliamentary Under-Secretary of State at the Department for International Development)
 Maggie Gee, novelist
 His Honour Judge Jonathan Gosling, Circuit Judge (LLB, 1978)
 Matt Hayes (television angler)
 Chris Heaton-Harris (Conservative MP)
 Brian Jenkins (former Labour MP)
 Jenny Jones (former Labour MP)
 Steven Linares, MP in the Gibraltar Parliament and Minister for Sport, Culture, Heritage & Youth in the Government of Gibraltar
 Juhar Mahiruddin (Governor of Sabah, Malaysia, and Chancellor of University Malaysia Sabah)
 Mil Millington (author)
 Magnus Mills (author)
 Mark O'Shea (zoologist and television presenter)
 Cornelia Parker (artist/sculptor)
 Richard Duncan, author and philanthropist
 Julian Peedle-Calloo (television presenter)
 Suzi Perry (television presenter and journalist)
 Robert Priseman (artist)
 Ken Purchase (former Labour MP)
 Chauhdry Abdul Rashid, former Lord Mayor of Birmingham and former Chancellor of Birmingham City University
 Michael Salu (graphic artist and creative director)
 Ged Simmons (television actor)
 John Spencer-Barnes (BBC broadcaster)
 Gillian Small (University Dean for Research, City University of New York)
 Ben Stewart, head of media at Greenpeace
 Clare Teal (jazz singer and broadcaster)
 Andy Thompson (footballer)
 Patrick Trollope (editor of UK's first online-only regional newspaper)
 Yatindra Nath Varma, former Attorney General of the Government of Mauritius (LLB, 1998)
 Sir Charles Wheeler, sculptor, President of the Royal Academy
 Annemarie Wright (artist)
 David Wright (Labour MP)
 Su Keong Siong (苏建祥) a Malaysian lawyer and Ipoh Timor MP.

Notable academics

 Roy Ascott, artist 
 John Buckley, military historian
 David Carpanini, artist
 Stephen Gill, political scientist
 Kimberly Hutchings, Professor of Politics and International Relations
 Howard Jacobson, Man Booker Prize-winning British author and journalist (Jacobson's experience formed the basis of his novel Coming from Behind, set at a "fictional" polytechnic in the Midlands.)
 Sir Anish Kapoor, sculptor 
 Steve Molyneux, educational technologist 
 Jeff Randall, broadcaster/journalist
 Laura Serrant, Professor of Community and Public Health Nursing
 Sir Alan Tuckett, Professor of Education and adult education specialist 
 Peter Waddington, social scientist
 Paul Willis, social scientist known for his work in sociology and cultural studies

References

Alumni of the University of Wolverhampton
Academics of the University of Wolverhampton
University of Wolverhampton